Michal Tonar (born 23 September 1969 in Plzeň) is a Czech former handball player who competed in the 1992 Summer Olympics.

References

1969 births
Living people
Czech male handball players
Olympic handball players of Czechoslovakia
Czechoslovak male handball players
Handball players at the 1992 Summer Olympics
Sportspeople from Plzeň